Cebolla Creek is a stream in Gunnison and Hinsdale counties in Colorado, United States, that is a tributary of the Gunnison River.

The river's name comes from the Native Americans of the area, who relied on wild onions (Spanish: cebolla) as a food source.

Historical names
Stream with the White Banks (translated from Ute)
Soda Creek - 1873
White Earth River - 1874
Cebolla Creek

See also

 List of rivers of Colorado

References

External links

Rivers of Gunnison County, Colorado
Rivers of Hinsdale County, Colorado
Rivers of Colorado